Mivali-ye Sofla (also Romanized as Mīvalī-ye Soflá; also known as Meyvolī, Mīr‘alī-ye Mīrkhān, and Mīvalī) is a village in Posht Tang Rural District, in the Central District of Sarpol-e Zahab County, Kermanshah Province, Iran. At the 2006 census, its population was 260, in 56 families.

References 

Populated places in Sarpol-e Zahab County